Nicholas James Phipps (born 9 January 1989) is an Australian rugby union player who played for the Australia national team and plays for Green Rockets Tokatsu in the Japan Rugby League One competition.

Early life

Phipps was educated at The King's School and in 2009 captained Sydney University's premiership-winning 1st Colts team.
He is currently studying a Masters of International Business at Sydney University.

Rugby playing career

Club level
Phipps signed to the Melbourne Rebels in July 2010. Phipps mentors for the 2011 Super Rugby season included former Wallaby halfback Sam Cordingley. Phipps said he was looking forward to learning from his fellow halfbacks, Cordingley, and Kingi, and also from Rebels centre (and former Wallaby) Julian Huxley.

In May 2012 Phipps combined with Kurtley Beale in the halves (9 & 10) against the Bulls from South Africa. Beale had been moved from fullback to flyhalf following Danny Cipriani's unexpected departure from the Rebels. Phipps scored a try under the posts.

Phipps moved back to Sydney to play for the Waratahs commencing 2014.

Rebels coach Damien Hill said, "Nick has played a major part in laying the foundations of this Club and it is disappointing to see him leave. He replicates our team ethos in everything he does, both on a off the rugby field."

The Wallabies and Waratahs scrum half re-signed with the ARU and NSW Waratahs in January 2017 for a two-year contract extension that takes Phipps through to the end of the 2019 season. In March 2017 he brought up his 100th super rugby cap.

On 1 February 2019, Phipps travel to England to join London Irish in the English Premiership ahead of the 2019–20 season.

International career
His grandfather and great uncle, both called Jim, played for the Wallabies. Following the rich family culture within rugby Phipps made his international debut playing for Australia in the 2009 IRB Sevens World Series.

Phipps played in the Australian Sevens at the 2010 Commonwealth Games, in Delhi. He scored a try and kicked eight conversions in his Games' debut. Australia went on to win Silver, losing the final to New Zealand.

In late 2010 Phipps toured with the Wallabies, and was named on the bench against the Leicester Tigers. In August 2011 Phipps became one of three halfbacks selected for the Wallabies in the 2011 Rugby World Cup. Phipps played 26 minutes for the Wallabies against Russia. He was one of three Rebels to play in the tournament, the others being new signings James O'Connor and Kurtley Beale. He has continued his international career playing and appearing in the bench frequently since his debut in the green and gold.

After almost two years since Phipps started for the Wallabies on home soil, he was chosen for his 29th start in a Wallabies jersey in the third deciding test against Ireland.

As at 30 June 2018 Phipps has played in 64 Tests for the Wallabies since debuting at the 2011 World Cup in New Zealand.

Awards
In 2016 he was named the Celebrity Men's Health Man of the Year
In 2017 he was named Sydney University Male Blue of the Year

Personal life
Phipps married Ebony in 2018 and welcomed son Huxley in early 2019.

References

External links
 Waratahs Profile
 Wallabies Profile

1989 births
Australian rugby union players
Australia international rugby union players
Australia international rugby sevens players
Male rugby sevens players
New South Wales Waratahs players
Melbourne Rebels players
Rugby union scrum-halves
Living people
Commonwealth Games silver medallists for Australia
Commonwealth Games medallists in rugby sevens
Commonwealth Games rugby sevens players of Australia
Rugby sevens players at the 2010 Commonwealth Games
Australian expatriate rugby union players
Expatriate rugby union players in England
London Irish players
Rugby union players from Sydney
Green Rockets Tokatsu players
Sydney (NRC team) players
Greater Sydney Rams players
Expatriate rugby union players in Japan
Medallists at the 2010 Commonwealth Games